Colostygia turbata is a moth of the family Geometridae. It is found from the mountains of Europe to the Altai, as well as the Kamchatka Peninsula and Canada.

Adults are in wing from June to July.

The larvae feed on Galium palustre. Larvae can be found from June to July. It overwinters in the larval stage.

Subspecies
Colostygia turbata turbata (Alps, south-eastern Europe) 
Colostygia turbata fuscolimbata Tengstrom, 1875 (northern Europe) 
Colostygia turbata pyrenaearia Oberthur, 1882 (Pyrenees)
Colostygia turbata altaicata (Djakonov, 1926) (Altai, Sayan Mountains, Buryatia, Kamchatka)
Colostygia turbata circumvallaria (Taylor, 1906) (Canada)

References

External links

Moth Photographers Group
Lepiforum.de

Cidariini
Moths of Europe
Taxa named by Jacob Hübner